Lertora is an Italian surname. Notable people with the surname include:

Federico Lértora (born 1990), Argentine footballer
Giuseppe Lertora (born 1946), Italian admiral
Mario Lertora (1897–1939), Italian artistic gymnast

Italian-language surnames